Boak is a family name.  Notable people with the name include:
Chet Boak (1935–1983), American baseball player
John Boak (1837–1876), Scottish cricketer
Keith Boak, British television director
Robyn Boak (born 1955), former Australian sprinter
Travis Boak (born 1988), Australian rules footballer

See also

Bill Boaks (1904–1986), British Royal Navy officer
Willa Cather Birthplace or Rachel E. Boak House
Boke (disambiguation)
Combat Organization of Anarcho-Communists known as BOAK